was a town located in Watarai District, Mie Prefecture, Japan.

As of 2003, the town had an estimated population of 18,437 and a density of 1,594.90 persons per km². The total area was 11.56 km².

On November 1, 2005, Obata, along with the town of Futami, and the village of Misono (all from Watarai District), was merged into the expanded city of Ise and thus no longer exists as an independent municipality.

External links
 Official website of Ise 

Dissolved municipalities of Mie Prefecture
Ise, Mie